"So Good" is a song from Australian pop group Wa Wa Nee. The song was released in February 1989 as the second single from their second studio album, Blush (1989). The song peaked at number 36 on the Australian ARIA Charts.

Track listing 
7" (CBS - 654546) 
Side A "So Good" - 3:58
Side B "The Other Side" - 2:35

12"' 
Side A "So Good" (Umbrella of Love Mix)
Side A "So Good" (Mixus Minimus)
Side B "So Good" (Hydro-House Mix)
Side B "So Good" (Goddess of Love Mix)

Charts

References 

1988 songs
1989 singles
Wa Wa Nee songs
Songs written by Paul Gray (songwriter)